Autozamm is a New Zealand rock band from Auckland, that has supported international acts such as the Black Crowes, INXS and Silverchair. The band has appeared at events such as the Big Day Out, Homegrown and Southern Amp.

Band members
Ollie Gordon (bass)
Nick Major (lead vocals, guitar)
Mike Carpinter (guitar, vocals)
Stephen Small (keyboards, vocals)
Richard Orr (drums)

"The Review" controversy 

In 2010, amateur music blogger Simon Sweetman hit out at Autozamm in a blog post on NZ On Air music funding, describing the group "terrible" and saying "they certainly do little to reflect any distinctly New Zealand culture." In response to this, Autozamm released the single "The Review" in 2012, which hit out at Sweetman and other critics.

Discography

Albums

EPs

Singles

References

www.nzmusic.com/music/autozamm
MySpace
www.amplifier.co.nz/artist/7760/autozamm.html
https://web.archive.org/web/20081018090656/http://www.nzmusician.co.nz/index.php/ps_pagename/article/pi_articleid/654
www.facebook.com/pages/Autozamm/10171516735

External links
Official Website
MySpace site

New Zealand alternative rock groups